Caroline County is a rural county located in the U.S. state of Maryland on its Eastern Shore. As of the 2020 census, the population was 33,293.  Its county seat is Denton.

Caroline County is bordered by Queen Anne's County to the north, Talbot County to the west, Dorchester County to the south, Kent County, Delaware, to the east, and Sussex County, Delaware, to the southeast.

History
Caroline County was created via 1773 Maryland General Assembly legislation from parts of Dorchester and Queen Anne's counties. The county derives its name from Lady Caroline Eden, wife of Maryland's last colonial governor, Robert Eden. Seven commissioners were originally appointed: Charles Dickinson, Benson Stainton, Thomas White, William Haskins, Richard Mason, Joshua Clark, and Nathaniel Potter. These men bought  of land at Pig Point (now Denton) on which to build a courthouse and jail.

Elections and other business transactions were completed there. The first commissioner meeting was held on March 15, 1774, at Melvill's Warehouse. In 1777, court was moved to Bridgetown (now Greensboro), but in the interest of convenience, court was moved back to Melvill's.

Disagreements arose concerning the permanent location of the county seat. The General Assembly reached a compromise in 1785 and ordered that  of land at Melvill's Landing should be purchased for a courthouse and jail. In 1790, the county court and its belongings moved to Pig Point. The Caroline County Courthouse was completed in 1797.

The county has a number of properties on the National Register of Historic Places. The National Park Service is developing a site in the southern half of Caroline County dedicated to interpreting the Underground Railroad as part of the Harriet Tubman Underground Railroad National Monument.

Government
Caroline County was granted home rule in 1984 under state code in an initiative led by County Commissioner Charles T. Dean, Sr.

The County Commissioners as of 2022 are:
 Frank Bartz - Republican
 J. Travis Breeding - Republican
 Larry C. Porter - Republican
County Administrator: Jeremy Goldman 
Executive Assistant to the County Commissioners: Kaleigh Leager

Growth is a major issue faced by Caroline County and several other Mid-Shore counties. Retirees and workers willing to commute across the Chesapeake Bay to the western shore are increasingly attracted by the rural environment and low cost of living.

From 1994 to 2014 Caroline was the only county in the state not represented by a resident legislator in the Maryland General Assembly. Redistricting and a sparse population were the chief causes.

Law enforcement

The Sheriff of Caroline County is Donnie Baker, who has held the position since 2022.

Politics
At a Presidential level, Caroline is the “reddest” county on the mostly Republican Eastern Shore, and rivals Carroll County as the most Republican county in the state outside of Appalachian Western Maryland. No Democratic presidential candidate has carried Caroline County since Lyndon Johnson’s landslide in 1964, and before then it had last gone Democratic in 1940 with Franklin D. Roosevelt. Indeed, the last Democrat to reach forty percent of the county’s vote was Jimmy Carter in 1980. In earlier times Caroline was a swing county, less secessionist than Wicomico, Worcester, Queen Anne’s or Cecil.

|}

Geography
It is the second-smallest county by total area in Maryland. Notable waterways include the Choptank River and Tuckahoe Creek, as well as the man-made Williston Lake.

Caroline County currently ranks seventh nationally in terms of land protected under the Ag Preservation Program.

Its eastern border is the Mason–Dixon line.

Caroline is the only Eastern Shore county not to touch either the Chesapeake Bay or Atlantic Ocean. Additionally, it is the only county on the Eastern Shore without an Interstate or United States Highway within its borders.

Tuckahoe State Park, Holiday Park Campgrounds and Martinak State Park are located in Caroline County.

The American Discovery Trail runs through the county.

Adjacent counties
 Kent County, Delaware (northeast)
 Sussex County, Delaware (southeast)
 Dorchester County (south)
 Talbot County (west)
 Queen Anne's County (northwest)

Demographics

2020 census

Note: the US Census treats Hispanic/Latino as an ethnic category. This table excludes Latinos from the racial categories and assigns them to a separate category. Hispanics/Latinos can be of any race.

2010 census
As of the 2010 United States Census, there were 33,066 people, 12,158 households, and 8,702 families living in the county. The racial makeup of the county was 79.8% white, 13.9% black or African American, 0.6% Asian, 0.4% American Indian, 0.2% Pacific islander, 3.1% from other races, and 2.1% from two or more races. Those of Hispanic or Latino origin made up 5.5% of the population. In terms of ancestry, 21.7% were German, 15.6% were Irish, 12.3% were English, and 6.9% were American.

Of the 12,158 households, 36.3% had children under the age of 18 living with them, 52.1% were married couples living together, 13.6% had a female householder with no husband present, 28.4% were non-families, and 22.7% of all households were made up of individuals. The average household size was 2.68 and the average family size was 3.12. The median age was 38.7 years.

The median income for a household in the county was $58,799 and the median income for a family was $65,801. Males had a median income of $45,944 versus $33,927 for females. The per capita income for the county was $24,294. About 8.0% of families and 11.5% of the population were below the poverty line, including 15.5% of those under age 18 and 11.1% of those age 65 or over.

2000 census
As of the census of 2000, there were 29,772 people, 11,097 households, and 8,156 families living in the county.  The population density was 93 people per square mile (36/km2).  There were 12,028 housing units at an average density of 38 per square mile (15/km2).  The racial makeup of the county was 81.69% White, 14.77% Black or African American, 0.37% Native American, 0.55% Asian, 0.02% Pacific Islander, 1.26% from other races, and 1.34% from two or more races.  2.65% of the population were Hispanic or Latino of any race. 17.4% were of American, 14.8% English, 14.4% German and 9.9% Irish ancestry.

There were 11,097 households, out of which 34.80% had children under the age of 18 living with them, 54.30% were married couples living together, 13.60% had a female householder with no husband present, and 26.50% were non-families. 21.50% of all households were made up of individuals, and 9.40% had someone living alone who was 65 years of age or older.  The average household size was 2.64 and the average family size was 3.03.

In the county, the population was spread out, with 26.80% under the age of 18, 7.70% from 18 to 24, 28.90% from 25 to 44, 23.10% from 45 to 64, and 13.50% who were 65 years of age or older.  The median age was 37 years. For every 100 females there were 95.90 males.  For every 100 females age 18 and over, there were 91.70 males.

The median income for a household in the county was $38,832, and the median income for a family was $44,825. Males had a median income of $31,119 versus $21,915 for females. The per capita income for the county was $17,275.  About 9.00% of families and 11.70% of the population were below the poverty line, including 14.50% of those under age 18 and 12.30% of those age 65 or over. It is regularly ranked among the poorest of all 23 Maryland counties.

As of Census 2010 the racial makeup of Caroline County was 78.19% Non-Hispanic white, 13.87% black, 0.37% Native American, 0.57% Asian, 0.16% Pacific Islander, 0.10% Non-Hispanics of some other race, 1.68% Non-Hispanics of two or more races and 5.49% Hispanic or Latino.

Education
Caroline County Public Schools provides public education in Caroline County.
North Caroline High School
Colonel Richardson High School

Media
The Caroline Review circulates monthly and is free of charge; a digital daily, Caroline Past and Present, was established in 2018.

Entertainment
The citizens of the towns of Hickman & Preston were once recognized by the TV show Hee Haw. In fact, the Hickman segment is the episode featured in the comedy wing of the Country Music Hall of Fame.
Baseball Hall of Famer Jimmie Foxx began his career as a semipro catcher in Ridgely. Another Hall of Famer, Home Run Baker, played for the town team as well.
Rocker George Thorogood played Caroline County bars while attending the University of Delaware before hitting the big time.
The 2004 South Caroline baseball team made it to the Little League World Series in Williamsport, Pennsylvania, and placed third in the nation.
Summerfest is held each August in Denton.
The Caroline-Dorchester County Fair is held each August in Williston.
The Strawberry Festival is held every Memorial Day weekend in Ridgely.

Transportation

Caroline County is one of three Maryland counties that does not have an Interstate or U.S. Highway running through it. Caroline's "major artery" is Maryland Route 404, four lanes in some parts but two lanes in others. It is chiefly used in the summertime by non-local beachgoers heading to Ocean City, Maryland, or Rehoboth Beach, Delaware.

Communities

Towns

Denton (county seat)
Federalsburg
Goldsboro
Greensboro
Henderson
Hillsboro
Marydel
Preston
Ridgely
Templeville (partly in Queen Anne's County)

Census-designated places
The United States Census Bureau recognizes three Census-designated places in Caroline County:

 Choptank
 West Denton
 Williston

Unincorporated communities

 American Corner
 Andersontown
 Baltimore Corner
 Bethlehem
 Brick Wall Landing
 Burrsville
 Gilpin Point
 Grove
 Harmony
 Hickman
 Hobbs
 Jumptown
 Linchester
 Oakland
 Oil City
 Tanyard
 Two Johns
 Reliance (partial)
 Whiteleysburg

Notable people and animals
James Gordon Bennett Jr., publisher, participated in a duel near Marydel in 1877.
Buddy, U.S. President Bill Clinton's chocolate Labrador Retriever
Charles Dickinson, killed in a duel in 1806 by future President Andrew Jackson
Frederick Douglass, orator, social reformer, former slave
Thomas Alan Goldsborough, noted jurist and congressman
Harry R. Hughes, Governor of Maryland, 1979-1987
Sophie Kerr, early 20th century author and benefactor of the largest undergraduate literary prize in the nation, at Washington College in Chestertown
William Richardson, hero of the Battle of Harlem Heights in the Revolutionary War
Thomas Alexander Smith, early 20th century congressman and businessman
Sherman W. Tribbitt, Governor of Delaware, 1973-1977
Harriet Tubman, abolitionist, humanitarian, former slave
George A. Waggaman, US senator from Louisiana

See also
National Register of Historic Places listings in Caroline County, Maryland
 USS Caroline County (LST-525)
 Museum of Rural Life

References

External links

Caroline County Fair
Times-Record, county newspaper

 

 
Maryland counties
1774 establishments in Maryland
Populated places established in 1774
Maryland counties on the Chesapeake Bay